WCRH at 90.5 FM is a religious radio station in Hagerstown, Maryland, owned by Cedar Ridge Ministries.

External links
 Official Website

Christianity in Hagerstown, Maryland
CRH
Moody Radio affiliate stations